Mo or MO may refer to:

Arts and entertainment

Fictional characters
 Mo, a girl in the Horrible Histories TV series
 Mo, also known as Mortimer, in the novel Inkheart by Cornelia Funke
 Mo, in the webcomic Jesus and Mo
 Mo, the main character in the Mo's Mischief children's book series
 Mo, an ophthalmosaurus from The Land Before Time franchise
 MO (Maintenance Operator), a robot in the Filmation series Young Sentinels
 Mo, a main character in Zoey's Extraordinary Playlist
 M-O (Microbe Obliterator), a robot in the film WALL-E
 Mo the clown, a character played by Roy Rene, 20th-century Australian stage comedian
 Mo Effanga, in the BBC medical drama series Holby City
 Mo Harris, in the BBC soap opera EastEnders
 Little Mo Mitchell, in the BBC soap opera EastEnders

Films
  "Mo" (魔 demon), original title of The Boxer's Omen, a 1983 Hong Kong film
 Mo (2010 film), a television movie about British politician Mo Mowlam
 Mo (2016 film), a Tamil horror film

Music
 M.O. (album), a 2013 album by American hip hop artist Nelly
 M.O, an English pop trio
 MØ, a Danish singer
 The MO, a Dutch pop band
 Mo Awards, annual awards for Australian live entertainment
 Yamaha MO, a music synthesizer

Other arts and entertainment
 Mo (Oz), a fictional country in the book The Magical Monarch of Mo by L. Frank Baum
 Mo (TV series), a 2022 comedy-drama

Businesses and organizations
 Altria Group, formerly Philip Morris (New York Stock Exchange symbol MO)
 Calm Air (IATA airline designator MO), an airline based in Thompson, Manitoba, Canada
 Milicja Obywatelska, a state police institution in Poland from 1944 to 1990

Language
 Mo (kana), Romanisation of the Japanese kana も and モ
 Mo language (disambiguation)
 Moldavian language (deprecated ISO 639-1 language code "mo")

People
 Mo (given name)
 Emperor Mo (disambiguation), the posthumous name of various Chinese emperors
 Mo (Chinese surname)
 Mo (Korean surname)
 MØ, Danish singer songwriter Karen Marie Ørsted (born 1988)
 Mr. Mo (rapper), rapper, member of the group Jim Crow
 Mr. Mo (singer), member of the Danish band Kaliber
 Mo Twister, Filipino radio DJ and TV host Mohan Gumatay (born 1977)
 Mo Hayder, a pen name of British crime novelist Beatrice Clare Dunkel (1962–2021)
 Mo (wrestler), ring name of Robert Horne (born 1964), professional wrestler

Places

Norway
 Mo i Rana, a town in Rana municipality, Nordland county
 Mo, Agder, a village in Vegårshei municipality, Agder county
 Mo, Innlandet, a village in Nord-Odal municipality, Innlandet county
 Mo, Møre og Romsdal, a village in Surnadal municipality, Møre og Romsdal county
 Mo, Telemark, a former municipality in the old Telemark county
 Mo, Vestland, a village in Modalen municipality, Vestland county
 Mo Church (disambiguation), a list of several churches by this name in Norway

Elsewhere
 County Mayo, Ireland (vehicle plate code MO)
 Macau (ISO 3166-1 alpha-2 country code MO)
 Missouri, US (postal abbreviation)
 Moscow Oblast, Russia
 Province of Modena, Italy (vehicle plate code MO)

Religion
 Mo (divination), a traditional Tibetan Buddhist technique of divination
 Mo (religion), an animist religion of the Zhuang people of China
 Modern Orthodox Judaism, a movement that attempts to synthesize Orthodox Jewish values with the secular world

Science and technology

Computing
 .mo, country code top level domain of Macau
 Magneto-optical drive (magneto-optical storage), a data storage medium
 Microsoft Office, an office software suite
 Mode of operation, in encryption block ciphers
 Motivating operation, a term describing the effectiveness of consequences in operant conditioning

Other uses in science and technology
 Mo (grist mill) (磨), ancient Chinese stone implements used to grind grain into flour
 Magnus and Oberhettinger aka "Formulas and Theorems for the Functions of Mathematical Physics", a mathematics book on special functions
 Manual override, a mechanism wherein control is taken from an automated system and given to the user
 Metalorganics, also known as organometallics, in chemistry and materials science
 Molecular orbital, a mathematical function describing the wave-like behavior of an electron in a molecule
 Molybdenum, symbol Mo, a chemical element
 Momentary open (MO), a group of electrical switches

Vehicles
 MO-class small guard ship, a class of small ships produced before and during World War II for the Soviet Navy
 Morris Oxford MO, an automobile produced by Morris Motors of the United Kingdom from 1948 to 1954

Other uses
 Mo (Chinese zoology), a name that semantically changed from "giant panda", to "a mythical chimera", to "tapir"
 Modus operandi (abbreviation m.o.), Latin meaning "mode of operation"; distinctive behavior patterns of an entity
 Month (abbreviation mo.), a unit of time of approximately 30 days
 Operation Mo, or the Port Moresby Operation, a Japanese plan to take the Australian Territory of New Guinea during World War II
 Medical officer (disambiguation)
 The Australian English diminutive word for moustache.

See also
 Meaux (disambiguation)
 mho, in physics, the reciprocal of the "ohm" unit of resistance
 Mø (disambiguation)
 Mobile (disambiguation)
 Moe (disambiguation)
 Moe's (disambiguation)
 Mohs (disambiguation)
 Mow (disambiguation)